HardBall 5 is a video game developed by American studio MindSpan and published by Sport Accolade for DOS, the Sega Genesis, and the PlayStation. Al Michaels provides color commentary.

Gameplay
HardBall 5 is a baseball game with completely adjustable statistics. All MLB teams are featured, although the team logos are absent and replaced with fictional ones.

A special league featuring historic teams of the past is also available.

Reception

Next Generation reviewed the Genesis version of the game as HardBall '95, rating it two stars out of five, and stated that "Sim fanatics will love the stats, but the poor gameplay quickly removes any ideas of playing out a whole season." 

Next Generation reviewed the PC version of the game, rating it three stars out of five, and stated that "The latest addition to the Hardball series is a good, solid one, but there's still a lot of room for improvement."

Next Generation reviewed the PlayStation version of the game, rating it two stars out of five, and stated that "Hardball 5 is best viewed as a strict statistical simulation. Anyone who's looking for a playable baseball game should look elsewhere."

 the game sold over 250,000 copies.

References

External links
HardBall 5 at GameFAQs

1995 video games
Accolade (company) games
Baseball video games
DOS games
HardBall!
PlayStation (console) games
Sega Genesis games
Video games developed in the United States